Pterocarya hupehensis is a tree in the Juglandaceae family native to China. It grows on moist streambanks at  elevation—mostly in North Guizhou, West Hubei (Changyang Xian), South Shaanxi, West Sichuan.

References

hupehensis